Echinocereus relictus is a species of hedgehog cactus.

References

relictus
Flora of Utah
Plants described in 2016